Klukowicze-Kolonia  is a village in the administrative district of Gmina Nurzec-Stacja, within Siemiatycze County, Podlaskie Voivodeship, in north-eastern Poland, close to the border with Belarus.

References

Klukowicze-Kolonia